21:03 is an American contemporary gospel, Christian R&B and Christian hip hop group from  Detroit, Michigan. Its members include Evin Martin and Torrence Greene. Former members were Jo'rel Quinn and Sean Grant. The group is signed to PAJAM and some of their albums include PAJAM Presents Twenty One O’ Three (2006) and Total Attention (2008). The group has also experienced Billboard success with their hit singles, "Still Here", "Incredible" and "Cover Me".

History 

The members of 21:03 were hand picked from hundreds of other singers in the Detroit area to be a part of the PAJAM record label. Critical acclaim for 21:03 includes a Stellar Award win and Grammy Award nomination.

Discography

Studio albums

Singles

References 

American gospel musical groups
Musical groups from Detroit
American hip hop groups
Christian hip hop groups